Camelopsocus is a genus of common barklice in the family Psocidae. There are about five described species in Camelopsocus.

Species
These five species belong to the genus Camelopsocus:
 Camelopsocus bactrianus Mockford, 1984
 Camelopsocus hiemalis Mockford, 1984
 Camelopsocus monticolus Mockford, 1965
 Camelopsocus similis Mockford, 1965
 Camelopsocus tucsonensis Mockford, 1984

References

Psocidae
Articles created by Qbugbot